Brian Bratton (born July 31, 1982) is a former Canadian football wide receiver who is currently a football coach at Indianapolis Colts. He most recently played for the Montreal Alouettes of the Canadian Football League. Having played with the Alouettes since 2007, he is a two-time Grey Cup champion, after winning in 2009 and 2010. He played college football for the Furman Paladins from 2002 to 2005.

Professional career

Atlanta Falcons
Bratton signed his first professional contract with the Atlanta Falcons of the National Football League in May 2005 and attended the team's training camp. He was later released in September of that year.

Baltimore Ravens
Following his release from Atlanta, Bratton signed with the Baltimore Ravens in October 2005 and spent time on the team's practice roster.

Cologne Centurions
After the 2005 season, Bratton was allocated to NFL Europe's Cologne Centurions in January 2006. While playing for Cologne, he started 10 games and caught 23 passes for 280 yards and two touchdowns. He was released in August, thereby terminating his contract with the Centurions.

Nashville Kats
Bratton signed with the Nashville Kats of the Arena Football League in November 2006, but was released during the following February.

Montreal Alouettes
Following his release from Nashville, Bratton signed with the Montreal Alouettes of the Canadian Football League on February 27, 2007 to a one-year plus an option contract. In his first season, he mainly played on special teams, returning punts and kickoffs. He recorded his first career touchdown on July 26, 2007 against the Toronto Argonauts on a 79-yard punt return. He achieved a career-high in touchdowns scored in the 2008 season when he scored seven receiving touchdowns.

He played in both of Montreal's Grey Cup victories in 2009 and 2010. In 2011, he recorded a career-high in receiving yards with 675 yards to go along with five touchdowns, including the 20th scored of his career that year. At the end of the 2012 Eastern Final against the Toronto Argonauts, Bratton missed an attempt to catch a deflected ball which would have been the game-tying touchdown with only 39 seconds left on third town. The Alouettes lost possession of the football and the Argonauts went on to win the 100th Grey Cup. Two weeks before entering free agency, Bratton was released on February 1, 2013 so that he could pursue offers from other teams.

In 2012, he won the Tom Pate Memorial Award for outstanding sportsmanship and because he had made a significant contribution to his team, his community and Association.

Statistics

References

External links 
 
 Montreal Alouettes bio

1982 births
Living people
Montreal Alouettes players
Furman Paladins football players
American players of Canadian football
Cologne Centurions (NFL Europe) players